Tobias Mølgaard Henriksen (born 22 July 1996) is a Danish professional footballer who plays as a right-back for Danish Superliga club AGF.

Career

Thisted
Mølgaard was born in Gudum, Lemvig Municipality, Denmark. As a youth, he started playing football for local clubs Gudum IF, Lemvig GF and Holstebro Boldklub, before joining the Thisted FC youth academy. He made his senior debut on the last matchday of the 2013–14 Danish 2nd Divisions season under head coach Christian Flindt Bjerg. In September 2014, he signed a two-year contract extension with the club.

Vejle
On 4 January 2018, it was announced that Vejle Boldklub had signed a two-and-a-half-year with Mølgaard starting from 1 July 2018, after he had made his breakthrough for the Thisted first team. In May 2019, he extended his contract with Vejle until 2022.

AGF
On 13 June 2022, Danish Superliga club AGF announced they had reached a deal to sign Mølgaard from Vejle on a three-year contract.

References

Danish men's footballers
1996 births
Living people
Association football defenders
People from Lemvig Municipality
Sportspeople from the Central Denmark Region
Holstebro BK players
Thisted FC players
Vejle Boldklub players
Aarhus Gymnastikforening players
Danish Superliga players
Danish 1st Division players
Danish 2nd Division players